Erebus acrotaenia is a moth of the family Erebidae. It is found in Indonesia (Ambon Island).

References

Moths described in 1861
Erebus (moth)